Miller-Kingsland House is located in Boonton, Morris County, New Jersey, United States. The house was built in 1740 and added to the National Register of Historic Places on July 24, 1973.

The Miller-Kingsland House is the oldest recorded home in Boonton and is listed on the New Jersey and National Registers of Historic Places. The original Dutch house was one-room with a sleeping attic, built by Johannes Miller in 1740. This room, which is complete with a large cooking fireplace and beehive oven, makes up the west wing of the current structure.

See also
National Register of Historic Places listings in Morris County, New Jersey

References

Houses on the National Register of Historic Places in New Jersey
Houses completed in 1740
Houses in Morris County, New Jersey
National Register of Historic Places in Morris County, New Jersey
New Jersey Register of Historic Places
1740 establishments in New Jersey
Boonton, New Jersey